This is a list of television programs based on toys, board games, and trading cards.

Docu-series 

 The Toys That Made Us - Netflix

Live-action

Animated
 Hot Wheels (1969) - Ken Snyder Properties, Pantomime Pictures
 He-Man and the Masters of the Universe (1983) - Filmation Associates
 ThunderCats (1985) - Telepictures Corporation
 She-Ra: Princess of Power (1985) - Filmation Associates
 Pound Puppies (1986) - Hanna-Barbera Productions, Tonka Corporation

 G.I. Joe (1983–1986) - Hasbro
 Jem and the Holograms - Hasbro
 Littlest Pet Shop - Hasbro
 Littlest Pet Shop (1995)
 Littlest Pet Shop (2012-2016)
 Littlest Pet Shop: A World of Our Own (2018-2019)
 My Little Pony - Hasbro
 My Little Pony (1984–1987)
 My Little Pony Tales (1992)
 My Little Pony: Friendship Is Magic (2010–2019)
 My Little Pony: Pony Life (2020-2021)
 Transformers - Hasbro
 The Transformers (1984–1987)
 Transformers: The Headmasters (1987–1988)
 Transformers: Super-God Masterforce (1988–1989)
 Transformers: Victory (1988–1989)
 Transformers: Zone (1990)

toys
TV